Cooperative Bank of South Sudan is a commercial bank in South Sudan. It is licensed and supervised by the Bank of South Sudan, the country's central bank and national banking regulator.

Cooperative Bank Group
Cooperative Bank of South Sudan is a member of the Cooperative Bank Group, headquartered in Nairobi, Kenya, with subsidiaries in Kenya and South Sudan. , the Group's asset base exceeded US$2.6 billion (KES:231.2 billion), with shareholders' equity in excess of US$414 million (KES:36.8 billion). The shares of stock of the Cooperative Bank Group are listed on the Nairobi Stock Exchange, where it trades under the symbol COOP. Members of the Cooperative Bank Group include the following companies:

 Kingdom Securities Limited - Nairobi, Kenya - 60% shareholding
 Co-opTrust Investment Services Limited - Nairobi, Kenya - 100% shareholding
 Co-operative Consultancy Services Kenya Limited - 100% shareholding
 CIC Insurance Group Limited - 25% shareholding
 Cooperative Bank of South Sudan - Juba, South Sudan - 51% shareholding

Ownership
The detailed ownership of the stock of Cooperative Bank of South Sudan is depicted in the table below:

Branch network
The bank has its headquarters in Juba, the capital of South Sudan and the largest city in that country. Four other branches are planned in Juba.

See also
 Economy of South Sudan
 Banking in South Sudan
 List of banks in South Sudan

References

External links
  Bank of South Sudan Website
  Website of Cooperative Bank of Kenya

Banks of South Sudan
Banks established in 2012
Companies based in Juba